Matthew Williams (born November 16, 1987) is an American former soccer player who played for the Dayton Dutch Lions of USL Pro.

College
Williams spent his entire college career at the University of Cincinnati.  In his senior season, Williams led Cincinnati to a ranking of ninth in the nation in goals-against-average and held opponents to only 14 goals in 19 matches.  He earned all-BIG EAST third team honors during that stretch.

Professional
After spending 2011 with USL PDL club GPS Portland Phoenix and with USL Pro club Wilmington Hammerheads, Williams signed with Dayton Dutch Lions on March 3, 2012.  He made his debut for the club a month later in a 0-0 draw with Charlotte Eagles. Williams finished the year leading the USLPro in saves with 115 while recording 5 shutouts and starting every game for the Dutch Lions.

References

External links
 Cincinnati Bearcats bio

1987 births
Living people
American soccer players
Cincinnati Bearcats men's soccer players
Cincinnati Kings players
GPS Portland Phoenix players
Wilmington Hammerheads FC players
Dayton Dutch Lions players
Sportspeople from Portland, Maine
Soccer players from Maine
USL League Two players
USL Championship players
Association football goalkeepers